Angelo Felici J.C.D. (26 July 1919, Segni – 17 June 2007, Rome) was an Italian Cardinal in the Roman Catholic Church and President of the Pontifical Commission Ecclesia Dei. Before this role he served as the Prefect of the Congregation for the Causes of Saints from 1988 to 1995.

Early life
He was ordained on 4 April 1942 and spent the next three years studying for his doctorate in canon law. In 1945 he joined the Vatican Secretariat of State where he worked until 1949. He was a faculty member at the Pontifical Ecclesiastical Academy, until he was appointed under-secretary of the Congregation for Extraordinary Ecclesiastical Affairs in 1964.

Episcopate
Pope Paul sent him on a mission to Jerusalem after the Six-Day War between Arabs and Israelis. Pope Paul VI appointed him as titular archbishop of Caesariana and appointed pro-nuncio to the Netherlands on 22 July 1967. He was consecrated as a bishop in September of the same year. His nine years in the Netherlands were known for their sharp conflicts within the Catholic Church, among other things about the celibacy issue and about two bishop's nominations that were supposed to be extremely conservative (Adrianus Johannes Simonis and Joannes Gijsen). He was transferred to Portugal in 1976 and finally to France in 1979.

Cardinalate
He was made Cardinal-Deacon of Santi Biagio e Carlo ai Catinari in the consistory of 28 June 1988 by Pope John Paul II. In 1988, he was appointed Prefect of the Congregation for the Causes of Saints, where he served until 1995. Then he was appointed President of the Pontifical Commission Ecclesia Dei. As Cardinal Deacons are permitted to do after ten years, he opted for the order of cardinal priests and his titular church was elevated pro hac vice to the rank of title on 9 January 1999. He lost the right to participate in a conclave when he turned 80 years of age in 1999.

Death
On 17 June 2007, Cardinal Felici died; Pope Benedict XVI sent his condolences and, on 19 June 2007, presided at Cardinal Felici's funeral Mass at the Altar of the Cathedra in Saint Peter's Basilica in the Vatican.

External links
GCatholic.org profile

References 

1919 births
2007 deaths
People from Segni
21st-century Italian cardinals
Apostolic Nuncios to France
Apostolic Nuncios to the Netherlands
Apostolic Nuncios to Portugal
Pontifical Ecclesiastical Academy alumni
Pontifical Gregorian University alumni
Members of the Congregation for the Causes of Saints
Pontifical Commission Ecclesia Dei
Cardinals created by Pope John Paul II
Commanders Crosses of the Order of Merit of the Federal Republic of Germany
20th-century Italian cardinals